Horace Valentin Crocicchia (6 November 1888 – 1976) was a colonial administrator in various colonies of the French Colonial Empire.

Titles Held

See also
List of colonial governors in 1942
List of colonial governors in 1943
List of colonial governors in 1944
Colonial heads of Guinea
Colonial heads of Côte d'Ivoire

References

French colonial governors and administrators
People of French West Africa
Governors of French India
1888 births
1976 deaths